Neosophia is a genus of parasitic flies in the family Tachinidae.

Species
Neosophia bispinosa Santis & Nihei, 2019
Neosophia elongata Guimarães, 1982
Neosophia guimaraesi Santis & Nihei, 2019

References

Diptera of South America
Diptera of North America
Dexiinae
Tachinidae genera